Trent may refer to:

Places

Italy
 Trento in northern Italy, site of the Council of Trent

United Kingdom
 Trent, Dorset, England, United Kingdom

Germany
 Trent, Germany, a municipality on the island of Rügen

United States
 Trent, California, United States
 Trent, Kentucky, United States
 Trent, Oregon, United States
 Trent, South Dakota, United States
 Trent, Texas, United States

Water courses
 River Trent, a major waterway of the English Midlands
 Trent River (Ontario)
 Trent–Severn Waterway

People

Ships and boats
 , various Royal Navy ships
 RMS Trent, a British steamship involved in the Trent Affair during the US Civil War
 , a steamship built in 1899
 Trent-class lifeboat, used by the Royal National Lifeboat Institution in the UK

Avionics
 Rolls-Royce RB.50 Trent, Rolls-Royce first turboprop engine
 Rolls-Royce RB.203 Trent, a turbofan engine
 Rolls-Royce Trent, a turbofan engine family manufactured by Rolls-Royce plc after the RB211

Other uses
 Council of Trent, a 16th-century Catholic council, held in Trento in northern Italy, in response to the Protestant Reformation
 Baron Trent, a title in the Peerage of the United Kingdom
 Trent University, a university located in Peterborough, Ontario
 Nottingham Trent University, a university in Nottingham, UK, formerly Trent Polytechnic
 Trent, an Alice and Bob placeholder used in cryptography, referring to a trusted arbitrator or third party
 Trent railway station, a closed British railway station
 Trent (Westside), the retail arm of Tata group
 Trent Accreditation Scheme, an international healthcare accreditation scheme headquartered in Sheffield, UK, in the former UK NHS Trent Region
 Trent Bridge, an international and county cricket ground in Nottingham, England

See also
 Trent Affair, an incident in 1861 during the US Civil War